Plot of Fear  (/ Too Much Fear), also known as Bloody Peanuts, is an Italian giallo movie directed in 1976 by Paolo Cavara. The film also includes a well-known animated erotic insert directed by Gibba in which, as said by Marco Giusti, "the great Gibba broke out in all kinds of sado-masochistic excess".

Plot 
Inspector Lomenzo investigates a series of murders committed against wealthy people. The inspector's sole lead is that the murderer is in the habit of leaving illustrations of the Struwwelpeter at the crime scene.

Cast 
 Corinne Cléry as Jeanne
 Tom Skerritt as Chief Inspector
 Michele Placido as Inspector Gaspare Lomenzo
 Eli Wallach as Pietro Riccio
 John Steiner as Hoffmann
 Jacques Herlin as Pandolfi
 Greta Vaillant as Laura Falconieri
 Quinto Parmeggiani as Angelo Scanavini

See also    
 List of Italian films of 1976

References

External links

1976 films
English-language Italian films
Giallo films
Films directed by Paolo Cavara
1970s crime thriller films
Italian crime thriller films
Films with live action and animation
1970s English-language films
1970s Italian films